Desiderius Orban,  (26 November 18844 October 1986) was a renowned Hungarian painter, printmaker and teacher, who, after emigrating to Australia in 1939 when in his mid-50s, also made an illustrious career in that country.

One of The Eight in Budapest, early 20th-century painters who were influential in introducing cubism, expressionism and Fauvism to Hungary, Orbán had been influenced by the paintings of Henri Matisse, Vincent van Gogh and Paul Cézanne, seen when he lived in Paris. After building a substantial career, in 1939 after the rise of Nazi Germany and the invasion of Poland, he left Hungary and emigrated to Sydney. He painted and taught for nearly another fifty years, influencing generations of students.

Biography
Born Orbán Dezső to Jewish-Hungarian parents in Győr, Hungary, in 1884, he moved as a child with his family to Budapest in 1888. There he later studied art with János Pentelei Molnár. He studied philosophy, physics and mathematics at the University of Budapest. In 1905, he performed the compulsory military service with the Austro-Hungarian army.

In 1906, Orbán moved to Paris, where he studied briefly at the Académie Julian, but gave up academic training to study alone. Numerous artists from Hungary were flocking to Paris at the time.

After his return to Budapest, in 1909 Orbán joined with several other young artists known as "neos", or Keresők (The Seekers). They were taking a different direction from the older artists of the Nagybánya school, whose painters had worked at what is now Baia Mare, Romania and first brought impressionist and post-impressionist techniques to Hungary.

At their second exhibit in 1911, the group took the name The Eight (Nyolcak); they brought contemporary painting techniques and expression from western Europe to Hungary. Other members of the group were Károly Kernstok, Béla Czóbel, Róbert Berény, Dezső Czigány, Ödön Márffy, Bertalan Pór, and Lajos Tihanyi.

In these early years, Orban came into contact with Pablo Picasso, Amedeo Modigliani and Georges Braque.

In 1912-13 he was called up again for military service in the Balkan Wars.

Marriage and family
In 1915, Orbán married Alice Vajda, a doctor serving in the army.

1930s and after
Through the 1920s, Orbán continued to work at art. In 1931, he founded the Arts and Crafts Academy, Atelier, in Budapest. In 1937, his painting Cathedral in Eger (1928) was seized by the Nazis from the Nuremberg Museum collection as they objected to modern art; it was never recovered.

With the rise of the Nazis, anti-Semitism and Fascism, in 1939 Orbán fled Budapest around the time of the German invasion of Poland and beginning of World War II. At the age of nearly 55, he emigrated first to London.

Emigration to Australia
Orbán went on to Sydney, Australia, where he settled. He changed his first name to Desiderius. In 1942 during the war, he enlisted in the Australian Army as a private. He began his own art school. For a time, to earn a living, he worked as a spray painter in a Sydney factory. In 1944, one of his paintings was purchased by the Art Gallery of New South Wales.

From 1946 to 1949, Desiderius Orbán was President of the NSW branch of the Contemporary Art Society of Australia. In 1953, he was elected Chairman of the UNESCO National Committee of Visual Arts. From 1957 to 1967, he conducted summer schools in painting at the University of New England, Armidale.

He was a judge for the 1960 Sulman Prize at the Art Gallery of New South Wales. In 1967, and again in 1971, he won the Blake Prize for Religious Art.

His students in Australia included Harold Thornton, Yvonne Audette, Margo Lewers, John Olsen, Pat Kelk Graham, Ruth Faerber (b. 1922), Panni Roseth, Olive Hughes, John Coburn, Ruth Burgess, Virginia Cuppaidge, James Clifford (1936–1987), Aileen Rogers (1916–1994), Sheila McDonald, Hilary Cassidy, Mary Curtis and Tom Green (1913-1981).

Orban died in Sydney in 1986, aged 101.

A collection of Desiderius Orban-related research material is housed at Lane Cove Library in Sydney.

Legacy
1975, he was appointed an Officer of the Order of the British Empire (OBE) for his service to the arts. 
1982, Orban was awarded the Gold Medal of the Order of the Hungarian Flag by the Hungarian People's Republic.

In the 21st century European museums have held major exhibits on the Hungarian modernists and marked the centenary of the first exhibit of The Eight.
 2006, Hungarian Fauves from Paris to Nagybánya, 1904-1914, 21 March—30 July 2006, Hungarian National Gallery 
 2010, A Nyolcak (The Eight): A Centenary Exhibition, 10 December 2010 – 27 March 2011, Janus Pannonius Museum, Pécs
 2012, The Eight. Hungary's Highway in the Modern (Die Acht. Ungarns Highway in die Moderne), 12 September - 2 December 2012, Bank Austria Kunstforum, Vienna, collaboration with Museum of Fine Arts and Magyar Nemzeti Galéria, Budapest.

Selected solo exhibitions
1917 Solo exhibition, Konyves Kalman Gallery, Budapest
1923 Helikon Gallery, Budapest
1924-31 Various solo exhibitions in Hungary, Romania and Czechoslovakia
1943 Notanda Gallery, Sydney
1944 Farmer's Blaxland Gallery, Sydney
1946 Macquarie Galleries, Sydney; Myer Art Gallery, Melbourne
1950 David Jones Art Gallery, Sydney
1952, 59 Macquarie Galleries, Sydney
1955 John Martin Art Gallery, Adelaide; Bissietta Art Gallery, Sydney
1957 Brummels Gallery, Melbourne
1960 Newcastle Regional Art Gallery
1963 Komon Gallery, Sydney; War Memorial Gallery of Fine Arts, University of Sydney; Douglas Galleries, Brisbane; Ipswich Arts Centre, Queensland
1964-68 Komon Gallery, Sydney
1969 Retrospective, Newcastle Regional Art Gallery
1969 Von Bertouch Galleries, Newcastle; Holdsworth Galleries, Sydney
1970, 71 Toorak Art Gallery, Melbourne
1972 Reid Gallery, Brisbane; Holdsworth Galleries, Sydney
1973 Langsam Galleries, Melbourne; The Sculpture Gallery, Sydney; Reid Gallery, Brisbane; Skinner Gallery, Perth
1975 Retrospective, Art Gallery of New South Wales
1976 David Sumner Gallery, Adelaide
1977 Artarmon Gallery, Sydney
1978 Barry Stern Gallery, Sydney; Queen Street Gallery, Sydney
1979 Trinity Delmar Gallery, Sydney
1979 Masterpiece Gallery, Hobart
1980 New South Wales House, London
1981 Niagara Lane Gallery, Melbourne

Selected group exhibitions
1909-12 Exhibited with the Keresok Group, then Nycolcak Group, in Budapest and Berlin
1914 Exhibition of Hungarian Artists, Vienna Kunstlerhaus
1918 Ernst Gallery, Budapest
1932 Still Life Exhibition, National Salon, Budapest – Hungarian representative
1940 Macquarie Galleries, Sydney
1943 Became a regular exhibitor with the Contemporary Art Society and the Society of Artists
'Australia in Pictures', David Jones Art Gallery, Sydney
1944 'Contemporary Australian Painting', Art Gallery of New South Wales
One Hundred and Fifty Years of Painting in Australia 1794-1944, Art Gallery of NSW
1945 The Herald Exhibition of 'Present Day Australian Art', Lower Town Hall, Melbourne
1948 Began exhibiting with The Sydney Group
1950 'Sydney Art Today', Finney's Gallery, Brisbane; Macquarie Galleries, Sydney
1951 'Jubilee Exhibition of Australian Art'
1952 'Australian Painting', Art Gallery of NSW; Macquarie Galleries, Sydney
1954 Royal Tour Exhibition, The Fellowship of Australian Artists
1954-56 Macquarie Galleries, Sydney
1956 'Contemporary Australian Painting', Pacific Loan Exhibition, Art Gallery of NSW and on board the 'SS Orcades'
1959 'Exposition des peintures du group Australian et Baltes', Gallerie Royale, Paris
1963 Australian Art Exhibition, Kuala Lumpur, Malaysia
1971 'Hungarian Avant Garde 1909-1930', Munich and Milan
1971-82 Numerous group exhibitions in Sydney, Melbourne, Brisbane, Adelaide, Hobart and Perth
1983 Exhibition with Loyd Rees at Masterpiece Gallery, Hobart

Awards
1929 Gold medal, International Exhibition in Barcelona, Spain (still life painting)
1957 Wagga Wagga Art Prize
1967 Blake Prize
1967 Muswellbrook Art Prize
1971 Blake Prize
1971 Wollongong Art Prize
1974 International Co-operation Art Award
1975 appointed an OBE for his service to the arts

Collections
Hungarian National Gallery, Budapest
Municipal Art Gallery, Szeged, Hungary
Nuremberg Museum, Germany
National Gallery of Australia, Canberra
Art Gallery of New South Wales, Sydney
Art Gallery of South Australia, Adelaide
National Gallery of Victoria, Melbourne
Queensland Art Gallery, Brisbane
Tasmanian Museum and Art Gallery, Hobart
Western Australian Art Gallery, Perth
Ballarat Fine Art Gallery, Victoria
Benalla Art Gallery, Victoria
Geelong Art Gallery, Victoria
Hamilton Art Gallery, Victoria
Horsham Regional Art Gallery, Victoria
Mildura Arts Centre, Victoria
Newcastle Regional Art Gallery, NSW
Queen Victoria Museum and Art Gallery, Launceston
University Art Gallery, University of Melbourne
Municipal collections: Wollongong, Muswellbrook

References

Present Day Artists in Australia (1969), edited by Mervyn Horton. Sydney: Ure Smith

External links
"Desiderius Orban", Prints and Printmaking, Australia 
List of Exhibitions at Eva Breuer
It's an Honour: OBE, Gov't of Australia

1884 births
1986 deaths
Hungarian Jews
Hungarian emigrants to Australia
Australian Jews
Australian painters
Jewish painters
Australian Officers of the Order of the British Empire
20th-century Hungarian painters
Blake Prize for Religious Art winners